Edrisi-ye Olya (also Romanized as Edrīsī-ye ‘Olyā) is a village in Mazu Rural District, Alvar-e Garmsiri District, Andimeshk County, Khuzestan Province, Iran. At the 2006 census, its population was 197, in 39 families.

References 

Populated places in Andimeshk County